Samuel Abbey-Ashie Quaye (born 14 April 2001) is a Ghanaian professional footballer who plays as a left-back for Ghanaian Premier league side Accra Great Olympics.

Career 
Quaye had been instrumental for Accra Great Olympics in the 2020–21 Ghana Premier League Season, providing an assist for his brother Maxwell Quaye to score a goal against Accra Hearts of Oak, to earn Olympics a 2–0 win.

References 

Living people
2001 births
Ghanaian footballers
Ghana Premier League players
Accra Great Olympics F.C. players
Ghana youth international footballers
Association football defenders
21st-century Ghanaian people